The Tang Prize is a set of biannual international awards bestowed in four fields: Sustainable Development, Biopharmaceutical Science, Sinology, and Rule of Law. Nomination and selection are conducted by an independent selection committee, which is formed in partial cooperation with the Academia Sinica, Taiwan's top research institution.

Philosophy 
In the advent of industrialization and globalization, humanity has greatly enjoyed the convenience brought about by science and technology. Yet, humanity also faces a multitude of critical environmental, socio-cultural, and ethical issues on an unparalleled scale, such as climate change, inequality, and moral degradation. Against this backdrop, Taiwanese billionaire entrepreneur Samuel Yin established the Tang Prize Foundation in December 2012.

With the aim to recognize and support contributors for their revolutionary efforts in the research fields critical to the 21st century, the Tang Prize is global in reach.  Laureates are selected on the basis of the originality of their work along with their contributions to society, irrespective of gender, religion, ethnicity, or nationality.

Award categories 
The award categories of the Tang Prize include Sustainable Development, Biopharmaceutical Science, Sinology, and Rule of Law.

The Prize in Sustainable Development recognizes those who have made extraordinary contributions to the sustainable development of human societies, especially through groundbreaking innovations in science and technology.

The Prize in Biopharmaceutical Science recognizes original biopharmaceutical or biomedical research that has led to significant advances towards preventing, diagnosing and/or treating major human diseases to improve human health.

The Prize in Sinology recognizes the study of Sinology in its broadest sense, awarding research on China and its related fields, such as Chinese thought, history, philology, linguistics, archaeology, philosophy, religion, traditional canons, literature, and art (excluding literary and art works). Honoring innovations in the field of Sinology, the Prize showcases Chinese culture and its contributions to the development of human civilization.

The Prize in Rule of Law recognizes individual(s) or institution(s) who have made significant contributions to the rule of law, reflected not only in the achievement of the candidate(s) in terms of the advancement of legal theory or practice, but also in the realization of the rule of law in contemporary societies through the influences or inspiration of the work of the candidate(s).

Laureates
Each laureate receives a Tang Prize medal and diploma. In addition, NT$40 million (US$1.3 million) cash prize is awarded in each category, as well as a research grant of NT$10 million (US$0.33 million), for a total of NT$50 million (US$1.63 million). Should two, or up to three, candidates receive an award in the same category, the cash prize and research grant are shared.

List of countries by laureates
Until 2022.

Selection Committee 
Nomination and selection for the first and second Tang Prize cycles (2013–2014 and 2015–2016, respectively) were conducted by the Academica Sinica on commission of the Tang Prize Foundation; beginning with the third prize cycle (2017–2018), nomination and selection are now conducted by an independent selection committee which is formed in partial cooperation with the Academia Sinica.

The Tang Prize Selection Committee is composed of four separate committees, one per prize category. The committees invite respected scholars and institutions from around the world, including many Nobel laureates, to submit nominees, ensuring those nominated have attained a sufficient level of achievement.

Timeline 
Events during the award year:

See also

 List of environmental awards

References

External links
Official Website

Academic awards
Awards established in 2014
Environmental awards
International awards
Science and technology awards
2014 establishments in Taiwan